The Deputy Director of the Central Intelligence Agency (DD/CIA) is a statutory office and the second-highest official of the Central Intelligence Agency. The DD/CIA assists the Director of the Central Intelligence Agency (D/CIA) and is authorized to exercise the powers of the D/CIA when the Director's position is vacant or in the Director's absence or disability.

Under current law, the Deputy Director is appointed by the President of the United States and is not required to be confirmed by the United States Senate. This position has been held by David Cohen since January 20, 2021.

History
The functions of this position were served by the Deputy Director of Central Intelligence (DDCI) until that position was abolished under the Intelligence Reform and Terrorism Prevention Act of 2004. The position of DD/CIA was created administratively by then-D/CIA Porter Goss and received statutory approval from the U.S. Congress in 2010.

The first DD/CIA was Kingman Douglass, appointed by the Director of Central Intelligence in 1946. In April 1953, Congress amended the National Security Act of 1947 to allow the President of the United States to appoint the DDCI (with U.S. Senate confirmation). The amendment stipulated that the Director and Deputy Director positions could not be simultaneously filled by military officers.

List of Deputy Directors of Central Intelligence (1946–2004)

Deputy Director of the Central Intelligence Agency (2005–present)

Hereafter the "Deputy Director of Central Intelligence" position was replaced by Deputy Director of the Central Intelligence Agency and the Principal Deputy Director of National Intelligence.

In popular culture
In the novel The Hunt for Red October, the character Vice Admiral James Greer is the fictional Deputy Director of the CIA; former U.S. Marine Jack Ryan takes over this role after Admiral Greer's death in Clear and Present Danger. He subsequently retires from the position following a highly publicized media scandal and the detonation of a nuclear weapon at the Super Bowl in The Sum of All Fears.

In the animated sitcom American Dad!'', the character Avery Bullock is the fictional Deputy Director of the CIA.

References